Heffington is a surname. Notable people with the surname include:

Don Heffington (1950–2021), American drummer, percussionist, and songwriter
Ryan Heffington (born 1973), American dancer and choreographer

See also
Huffington